The soundtrack to The Royal Tenenbaums features a score composed by Mark Mothersbaugh. Also featured are a variety of rock songs from the 1960s through 1990s.

There have been two soundtrack album releases for The Royal Tenenbaums. The first, in 2001, omitted some songs; notably, Paul Simon's "Me and Julio Down by the Schoolyard," Van Morrison's "Everyone," John Lennon's "Look at Me," the Mutato Muzika Orchestra's version of the Beatles' "Hey Jude," two tracks by the Rolling Stones ("She Smiled Sweetly" and "Ruby Tuesday"), and Erik Satie's "Gymnopédie no. 1".

In 2002, the soundtrack was re-released with three songs not found on the 2001 release, but the two songs by the Rolling Stones were not included, because, while the band allows their music to be used in films, they rarely allow the songs to appear on soundtracks. The Van Morrison track, which served as the closing credits song, was also still missing. Additionally, the "Lindbergh Palace Hotel Suite," credited as original music by Mark Mothersbaugh on the 2001 release, was retitled on the 2002 soundtrack release as "Sonata for Cello and Piano in F Minor," performed by the Mutato Muzika Orchestra. The adapted sonata was originally written by the Romanian composer George Enescu (although it has been erroneously credited to the French composer Maurice Ravel; the confusion might come from the fact that the two composers were friends and attended the same composition classes).

Releases

2001 soundtrack release

2002 soundtrack re-release

2001 Oscar promo 
A promotional CD featuring Mothersbaugh's score for the film was released in 2001 in correspondence with the Academy Awards. It was available in limited quantity.

 "The Royal Tenenbaums"
 "The Lindbergh"
 "Margot Returns Home"
 "I'm Dying"
 "Something's Brewing"
 "Look at That Ol' Grizzly Bear"
 "Mothersbaugh's Canon"
 "Raleigh and Margot"
 "You're True Blue, Ethyl"
 "Heavy Duty"
 "How Can I Help"
 "To Be a Tenenbaum"
 "It's a Divorce"
 "Chas Chases Eli"
 "I Need Help"
 "Rooftop Talk"
 "Lindburgh"
 "End Credits"

References 

Comedy-drama film soundtracks
2001 soundtrack albums